This is a list of all GWR Hall Class engines built by the Great Western Railway.

References
 

 List of 4900 Class
Gwr 4900 Class Locomotives